Stiles Junction is an unincorporated community located in the town of Stiles, Oconto County, Wisconsin, United States.

History
The community was named for the Stiles family of local settlers, natives of Stilesville, Indiana. The junction was located at a diamond crossing between an east-west line of the Chicago and North Western Railway (C&NW) crossing the north-south Milwaukee Road. The C&NW's branch line ran between Clintonville and nearby Oconto, while the Milwaukee Road's line connected Milwaukee and the Upper Peninsula of Michigan. The line east of Stiles Junction is now abandoned, while tracks in the other directions are now owned and operated by the Escanaba and Lake Superior Railroad.

References

Unincorporated communities in Oconto County, Wisconsin
Unincorporated communities in Wisconsin
Former Chicago and North Western Railway stations
Former Chicago, Milwaukee, St. Paul and Pacific Railroad stations
Railway stations in Wisconsin